John Glückstadt is a 1975 West German drama film directed by Ulf Miehe. It was entered into the 25th Berlin International Film Festival.

Cast
 Dieter Laser as John Hansen "Glückstadt"
 Marie-Christine Barrault as Hanna Hansen
 Johannes Schaaf as Bügermeister
 Dan van Husen as Wenzel
 Tilo Prückner as Michel
 Juliette Wendelken as Christine Hansen
 Tilli Breidenbach as Mariken
 Rudolf Beiswanger as Nachbar Tischler

References

External links

1975 films
1975 drama films
German drama films
West German films
1970s German-language films
Films directed by Ulf Miehe
Films based on German novels
Films based on works by Theodor Storm
Films set in the 1850s
German black-and-white films
1970s German films